Jixian County is a county of eastern Heilongjiang province, People's Republic of China. It is under the jurisdiction of the prefecture-level city of Shuangyashan.

Administrative divisions 
Jixian County is divided into 5 towns and 3 townships. 
5 towns
 Fuli, Jixian, Shengchang, Fengle, Taiping
3 townships
 Yaotun, Xing'an, Yong'an

Demographics 

Climate

Notes and references 

Jixian
Shuangyashan